Vall is a surname. Notable people with the surname include:

 Ely Ould Mohamed Vall (born 1953), Mauritanian military officer
 Raymond Vall (born 1942), French politician

See also
 Örjans Vall, football stadium in Halmstad, Sweden
 Vall, the Europa analog in Kerbal Space Program

 Valla (disambiguation)
 Valle (disambiguation)
 Valli (disambiguation)
 Valls (disambiguation)

 Val (disambiguation)